Peace is the debut album by Anything Box, originally released in 1990 on Epic and now on endpop as a newly remastered version (2018).  The album played a significant role in the resurrection of American electronic/synthpop in the late 1980s and early 1990s.  With catchy synth-driven hooks and sing-along vocals, the album contains many of the band's most popular songs to date.  The album spawned three singles, most notably "Living in Oblivion", which is Anything Box's highest charting song to date.  The album, often considered an essential "classic" in the synthpop community still remains in print in the form of Peace MMXVIII (2018) on endpop.com.

Track listing

"Living in Oblivion" – 5:12
"When We Lie" – 4:00
"Kiss of Love" – 4:57
"Jubilation" – 4:59
"Soul on Fire" – 4:58
"Our Dreams" – 5:18
"Carmen" – 4:55
"Lady in Waiting" – 5:13
"I Felt the Pain" – 5:32
"Hypocrites" – 5:27
"Just One Day" – 5:01
"All These Days Undone" – 3:24

Personnel
Anything Box
Claude S
Dania Morales
Paul Rijnders

References

Anything Box albums
1990 debut albums
Epic Records albums